Berengar Fredol may refer to:

Berengar Fredol the Elder (1250–1323), cardinal-bishop of Frascati
Berengar Fredol the Younger (died 1323), cardinal-bishop of Porto